Johan Lammerts (born 2 October 1960 in Bergen-op-Zoom, North Brabant) is a retired road bicycle racer from the Netherlands, who was a professional rider from 1982 to 1992. His biggest success came in 1984, when he won the Tour of Flanders and the Ronde van Nederland. Lammerts also won the 20th stage in the 1985 Tour de France.

Teams
1982: TI–Raleigh(Netherlands)
1983: TI–Raleigh(Netherlands)
1984: Panasonic (Netherlands)
1985: Panasonic (Netherlands)
1986: Vini Ricordi (Italy)
1987: Toshiba (France)
1988: Toshiba (France)
1989: AD Renting-Coors Light (Belgium)
1990: Z (France)
1991: Z (France)
1992: Z (France)

Tour de France
1983 – 72nd
1985 – 75th
1988 – 130th
1989 – 123rd

References
 

1960 births
Living people
Dutch male cyclists
Dutch Tour de France stage winners
Sportspeople from Bergen op Zoom
Cyclists from North Brabant